Küplü is a belde (town) in Meriç district of Edirne Province, Turkey. At  Küplü is almost at the Greece border. The population of Küplü was 2654  as of 2013. In the 19th century Küplü was a Greek settlement. But according to the Population exchange between Greece and Turkey agreement Greeks were replaced by Turks and [Macedonians (Македонци)].

References

Towns in Turkey
Populated places in Meriç District